12 Golden Country Greats is the fifth studio album by the American rock band Ween, and their third on Elektra Records. It is the only album on which the group limited themselves to a specific genre of music (in this case, country music).

Background and recording
According to producer and friend of the band Ben Vaughn, Ween asked him to produce the album because he already had experience working with musicians in the Nashville country scene, having produced Arthur Alexander's album Lonely Just Like Me (1993) and co-written songs with Rodney Crowell and Gary Nicholson. The legendary Bradley's Barn was chosen as the recording studio for the album.

Some musicians, such as keyboardist Bobby Emmons (who also served as a church deacon) and Danny Davis, declined to participate in the recording due to the "blue" nature of much of the material, but Ween and Vaughn still got many highly regarded country musicians to play on the album. Later, Ween assembled some of the session musicians again into a touring band dubbed The Shit Creek Boys.

Album title
Despite the album’s title, it only features ten tracks. Ween claimed that the "12" represents the veteran musicians that appear on the record.

However, the band did indeed record twelve songs during the demo sessions for the album. When it came time to record the actual album, the band chose not to use the songs "I Got No Darkside" and "So Long, Jerry" but kept the album title. "So Long, Jerry", a tribute to the then recently deceased Jerry Garcia, was featured as a B-Side on the "Piss Up a Rope" single.

Song information
The session musicians were responsible for almost all of the instrumentation on the album. The only instrumental parts recorded by the core members of Ween were guitar solos by Dean and Gene on "I Don't Wanna Leave You on the Farm" and "Fluffy", respectively.

Gene sings the lead vocal part on every song except "Piss Up a Rope" and "Help Me Scrape the Mucus off My Brain", which feature Dean on lead vocals. The Jordanaires, best known for having provided background vocals for Elvis Presley, appear on the tracks "I'm Holding You" and "Powder Blue".

The melody of "Japanese Cowboy" closely resembles that of "Chariots of Fire" by Vangelis. The band has played the two songs as a medley in live shows.

In the tradition of country music, during "Powder Blue", Gene introduces each member of the band, who then plays a short solo on their instrument. The track was intended to run for 4:16, the last approximately one minute of which would consist of an audio clip of Muhammad Ali from after the Rumble in the Jungle fight playing over the backing instrumental track of the song. Ali's lawyers denied Ween permission to use the audio sample, but the album had already been mixed by that point, and Elektra accidentally initially pressed the album with Ali's speech still included. Repressings contain a cropped version of the track that ends abruptly at 3:13, after the introduction: "Ladies & Gentlemen, I'd like to present Muhammad Ali" (who is no longer heard).

"Help Me Scrape the Mucus off My Brain" is a riff on Merle Haggard's "If We Make It Through December", featuring a nearly identical melody, but played much faster than Haggard's more somber original.

Singles
"Piss Up a Rope" was released as a 7-inch vinyl single on Diesel Only Records. The B-side was "Sweet Texas Fire", a non-album track recorded during the Chocolate & Cheese sessions.

"You Were the Fool" and "Piss Up a Rope" were released together as a 7-inch vinyl single on Flying Nun Records (with "You Were the Fool" on "Side A" and "Piss Up a Rope" on "Side AA"). "So Long Jerry" (a tribute to Jerry Garcia recorded during the 12 Golden Country Greats sessions, but omitted from the final album) was included with these songs on a CD single issued by Elektra.

Reception

Reviews for the album were mostly positive. Stephen Thomas Erlewine of Allmusic called it "as satisfying as any of their records, and gutsier, too", despite interpreting "Mister Richard Smoker" as being homophobic, and awarded the album 4 stars out of 5. Sputnikmusic's Zachary Powell gave the album  stars out of 5 and claimed that "Writing songs about similar themes to what country songs have been written about but including their personal brown touch is what the band does best." Another writer for the same site, Bill Thomas, gave the album 4 stars out of 5. Ethan Smith of Entertainment Weekly, on the other hand, railed against the album, describing the songs as being "notable more for their homophobia, misogyny, and racism than for anything funny", and gave it a C−.

In a 2011 interview, producer Ben Vaughn remarked that, when the album was released, many Ween fans were confused by the radical break with the band's previous sound, comparing it to the fan reception given to Neil Young's album Trans.

Track listing
All tracks written by Ween.

Personnel
Ween
 Dean Ween – vocals, guitar on "I Don't Want to Leave You on the Farm"
 Gene Ween – vocals, guitar on "Fluffy"

Additional musicians
 The Jordanaires – vocals
 Pete Wade – Dobro, guitar, 6-string bass
 Bob Wray – bass
 Kip Paxton – bass
 Buddy Blackman – banjo
 Russ Hicks – pedal steel
 Buddy Spicher – fiddle, mandolin
 Bobby Ogdin – piano
 Hargus "Pig" Robbins – piano
 Denis Solee – clarinet
 Charlie McCoy – organ, banjo, bass, harmonica, percussion, trumpet, tuba, vibraphone
 Gene Chrisman – drums
 Buddy Harman – drums
 Bobby Bradley – engineer
 Ben Vaughn – producer
 Chuck Dehaan – art direction

Charts

References

1996 albums
Ween albums
Elektra Records albums
Alternative country albums by American artists
Albums produced by Ben Vaughn